"Do Right Woman, Do Right Man" (also written "Do Right Woman — Do Right Man") is a song written by Chips Moman and Dan Penn, and made famous by Aretha Franklin. Her version was released on February 10, 1967. Rolling Stone listed it as number 476 in their list of the 500 Greatest Songs of All Time.

Production

"Do Right Woman, Do Right Man" was written by Chips Moman and Dan Penn. It was produced by Jerry Wexler.

Franklin began recording the song in 1967 at Rick Hall's FAME Studios in Muscle Shoals, Alabama, after completing "I Never Loved a Man (The Way I Love You)". During the session, Franklin's then-husband and manager Ted White got upset over something trumpeter Ken Laxton said, and at the motel afterwards Rick Hall's attempt to explain things resulted in a fight between him and White. The following morning, it was found that Franklin and White had left with the song still unfinished. Penn recalled:

I Never Loved a Man the Way I Love You was also recorded at FAME in the same session but after the altercation started by Ted White, producer Jerry Wexler decided to complete recording of the LP in New York. Franklin disappeared for several weeks according to one source, later reappearing in New York City.  She then finished the song with the help of her sisters Carolyn and Erma. Penn recalled:

Composition
At the beginning of the song, Franklin sings with a gospel-inspired tone, which continues through the bridge. Through overdubbing, Franklin plays both the piano and the organ.

According to Bill Janovitz of Allmusic, "Do Right Woman, Do Right Man" contrasts the power of temptation and rewards of fidelity. He notes that its melody is "soothing". Patricia Hill Collins writes that it has a feminist message, urging African-American men to respect women as their equals and not follow the then-common belief that it is "a man's world" by using or abusing them; she also writes that the song urges men to be loyal, responsible, and "sexually expressive".

Although the song is originally heavily inspired by soul, covers have different styles. For example, The Flying Burrito Brothers cover in 1969 was a "country-soul waltz".

Critical reception
"Do Right Woman, Do Right Man" spent 11 weeks on the charts, peaking at number 9. It was included on Franklin's album I Never Loved a Man the Way I Love You and the single was released as the b-side to "I Never Loved a Man (The Way I Love You)". It also reached number 37 on the R&B chart. Wexler called it "perfection".

In 2004, Rolling Stone selected "Do Right Woman, Do Right Man" as one of the 500 Greatest Songs of All Time at 473th. As of the 2010 edition, it is ranked 476th.

In the 1991 film Cape Fear, Max Cady (Robert De Niro) tries to seduce a teenage girl (Juliette Lewis) while dancing with her to the song.

The song was featured in the 1995 film Dead Presidents.

Covers

From Allmusic.
Cher
Dionne Warwick 
Joan Baez
Etta James
The Sweet Inspirations
The Flying Burrito Brothers
Barbara Mandrell, whose version went to number 17 on the country chart, 1971.
Willie Nelson
Dan Penn
Kitty Wells
Joe Cocker
The Commitments

Joe Tex
Elkie Brooks
Phoebe Snow
William Bell
Martina McBride
Sinead O’Connor
The Three Degrees
The Revelators
Whitney Houston
Delaney and Bonnie
George Lewis
Truckasaurus including Lisa Miller

References

Bibliography

External links
 
 

1967 songs
1967 singles
1971 singles
Songs with feminist themes
Aretha Franklin songs
Barbara Mandrell songs
Sweet Inspirations songs
Songs written by Chips Moman
Song recordings produced by Jerry Wexler
Songs written by Dan Penn
Atlantic Records singles